Guilherme Mascarenhas Santana, known as just Guilherme born in the Brasília is a midfielder.

Career
Plays in the Goiás.

Career statistics
(Correct )

Contract
 Goiás.

See also
Football in Brazil
List of football clubs in Brazil

References

External links
 ogol
 soccerway

1990 births
Living people
Brazilian footballers
Goiás Esporte Clube players
Association football midfielders
Footballers from Brasília